The following list contains a run down of politicians, individuals, Constituency Labour Parties, trade unions (both Labour Party affiliated and not), Socialist societies, newspapers, magazines and other organisations that endorsed a candidate in the 2015 leadership election

Labour politicians

Andy Burnham
David Blunkett, former Home Secretary (2001–2004)
Lord Falconer of Thoroton, former Shadow Lord Chancellor (2015–2016)
Theresa Griffin, MEP for North West England
Afzal Khan, MEP for North West England
Lord Kinnock, former  Leader of the Opposition and former Leader of the Labour Party (1983–1992)
Lord Levy, businessman, Labour Party fundraiser
Lord Prescott, former Deputy Prime Minister (1997–2007) and former Deputy Leader of the Labour Party (1994–2007)
Peter Soulsby, former MP and current Mayor of Leicester (2011–present)
Catherine Stihler, MEP for Scotland
Glenis Willmott, MEP for the East Midlands and Leader of the European Parliamentary Labour Party

Yvette Cooper
Gordon Brown, former Prime Minister of the United Kingdom and former Leader of the Labour Party (2007–2010)
Richard Corbett, MEP for Yorkshire and the Humber
Seb Dance, MEP for London
Anneliese Dodds, MEP for South East England
Neena Gill, MEP for the West Midlands
Richard Howitt, MEP for the East of England
Alan Johnson, former Shadow Chancellor (2010–2011) and former Home Secretary (2009–2010)
Jude Kirton-Darling, MEP for North East England
Richard Leese, current Leader of Manchester City Council (1996–present)
Clare Moody, MEP for South West England
Claude Moraes, MEP for London
David Martin, MEP for Scotland
Linda McAvan, MEP for Yorkshire and the Humber
Rhodri Morgan, former First Minister of Wales (2000–2009) 
Siôn Simon, MEP for the West Midlands
Derek Vaughan, MEP for Wales
Kezia Dugdale, Leader of the Scottish Labour Party (2015–2017)
Ian Murray, Shadow Secretary of State for Scotland (2015–2016), MP for Edinburgh South

Jeremy Corbyn
Lucy Anderson, MEP for London
Mick Antoniw, Member of the Welsh Assembly for Pontypridd
Jennette Arnold, Chair of London Assembly and AM for North East
Katy Clark, former Scottish Labour MP for North Ayrshire and Arran
Tam Dalyell, former Father of the House of Commons (2001–2005)
Mark Drakeford, current First Minister of Wales.
David Drew, former MP for Stroud
Neil Findlay, MSP for Lothian
Mike Hedges, Member of the Welsh Assembly for Swansea East
Cara Hilton, Member of the Scottish Parliament for Dunfermline (Initial endorsement of Andy Burnham withdrawn)
Ken Livingstone, former Mayor of London (2000–2008) (Initial endorsement of Andy Burnham withdrawn)Jenny Manson, former councillor for Colindale in Barnet 
Stan Newens, former MP and MEP
Elaine Smith, MSP for Coatbridge and Chryston
Julie Ward, MEP for North West England
Chris Williamson, former MP for Derby North
Christian Wolmar, candidate for the Labour Party's nomination for Mayor of London in the 2016 election

Liz Kendall
Baroness Armstrong of Hill Top, former Chief Whip (2001–2006)
Paul Brannen, MEP for North East England
Charles Clarke, former Home Secretary (2004–2006)
Alistair Darling, former Chancellor of the Exchequer (2007–2010)
Lord Glasman, life peer in the House of Lords and founder of Blue Labour
Patricia Hewitt, former Secretary of State for Health (2005–2007)
Mary Honeyball, MEP for London
Lord Hutton of Furness, former Secretary of State for Defence (2008–2009) 
Alan Milburn, former Secretary of State for Health (1993–2003)
Lord Reid of Cardowan, former Home Secretary (2006–2007)
David Miliband, former Foreign Secretary (2007–2010) and current CEO of International Rescue Committee (2013–present)
Jim Murphy, former leader of the Scottish Labour Party (2014-2015)
Jacqui Smith, former Home Secretary (2007–2009)
Baroness Taylor of Bolton, former Chief Whip (1998–2001)

Individuals
Andy Burnham
Charlie Condou, actor and writer
Steve Coogan, actor and comedian
Liam Fray, frontman of indie rock band Courteeners
Clare Gerada, general practitioner and former Chair of the Council of the Royal College of General Practitioners (2010–2013)
Eddie Izzard, actor and comedian
Sally Lindsay, actress and television presenter
Abby Tomlinson, founder and leader of the Milifandom
David Walliams, comedian, actor and author

Yvette Cooper
Dan Hodges, journalist, blogger and Daily Telegraph columnist
Sarah Solemani, actress and playwright
Polly Toynbee, journalist and Guardian columnist
Robert Webb, comedian, actor and writer

Jeremy Corbyn

Bill Bailey, comedian
Sean Bean, actor
Mary Beard, classical scholar and Cambridge don
Moazzam Begg, former extrajudicial detainee
Alan Bennett, playwright, screenwriter, actor and author 
Danny DeVito, actor
Danny Dorling, social geographer
Laurence Dreyfus, musicologist
Erin Belieu, poet
Ian Birchall, Marxist historian, translator and author
Billy Bragg, singer-songwriter and left-wing activist
Russell Brand, comedian, actor and political activist
Charlotte Church, singer-songwriter and television presenter
Piers Corbyn, weather forecaster, political activist and brother of Jeremy Corbyn
Simon Deakin, Professor of Law at the Faculty of Law, Cambridge
Brian Eno, musician and composer
Cristina Fernández de Kirchner, President of Argentina
Alec Finlay, artist
Keith Flett, socialist historian and political activist
Martin Freeman, actor
George Galloway, Leader of the Respect Party (2013–2016), broadcaster and former MP for Bradford West (2012–2015)
Derek Hatton, former Deputy Leader of Liverpool City Council, member of the Labour Party and Trotskyist Militant group
Julie Hesmondhalgh, actress
Susan Himmelweit, economist, Emeritus Professor of Economics for the Open University
Rufus Hound, comedian, actor and presenter
Pablo Iglesias Turrión, current Leader of Podemos (2014–present) and former political science lecturer at the Complutense University of Madrid
Helen Ivory, poet and artist
Bianca Jagger, social and human rights advocate
Selma James, feminist writer
Owen Jones, author, Guardian columnist and political activist (Initial draft endorsement of Lisa Nandy withdrawn)Steve Keen, Economics Professor at Kingston University, author
Shia LaBeouf, actor
Costas Lapavitsas, Popular Unity (formerly Syriza) Member of the Hellenic Parliament (2015–present) and economics professor at the School of Oriental and African Studies
Ken Loach, film and television director
Josie Long, comedian
Caroline Lucas, former Leader of the Green Party (2008–2012) and current MP for Brighton Pavilion (2010–present)
Paul Mackney, trade unionist, political activist and former General Secretary of the National Association of Teachers in Further and Higher Education
Miriam Margolyes, actress
Ian Martin, comedy writer and columnist for The GuardianFrancesca Martinez, comedian and writer
Mark McGowan, performance artist and YouTube personality
Seumas Milne, columnist and associate editor of The GuardianGeorge Monbiot, writer and environmental and political activist
Nicholas Murray, biographer and poet
Phyll Opoku-Gyimah, co-founder and executive director of UK Black Pride
Ilan Pappé, historian and socialist activist
Maxine Peake, actress
Laurie Penny, best-selling feminist writer and journalist
Grayson Perry, contemporary artist
Pascale Petit, poet
Tom Pickard, poet and documentary film maker
Kate Pickett, Professor of Epidemiology at the University of York
Daniel Radcliffe, actor
Michael Rosen, children's novelist and poet
Jolyon Rubinstein, actor, writer, producer and director, best known for writing and performing on The Revolution Will Be Televised''
Alfredo Saad-Filho, economist, Professor at the University of London
Michael Schmidt, poet, author and scholar
Will Self, author, journalist, political commentator and television personality
Avi Shlaim, historian and Emeritus Professor of International Relations at the University of Oxford
Lord Skidelsky, economics historian and author
Harry Leslie Smith, writer and political commentator
Guy Standing, economist, professor of Development Studies at the School of Oriental and African Studies
Joseph Stiglitz, economist and Nobel Economic Prize laureate (2001)
Mark Serwotka, General Secretary of the Public and Commercial Services Union
Peter Tatchell, LGBT and human rights activist
David Thacker, theatre-director
Emma Thompson, actress, comedian and author
Yanis Varoufakis, Greek economist, academic and politician and a Syriza member of the Hellenic Parliament (MP) for Athens B
Hilary Wainwright, sociologist, socialist feminist, magazine editor and political activist
Dave Ward, General Secretary of the Communication Workers Union
Rory Waterman, poet
John Weeks, economist, Emeritus Professor at the University of London
Richard G. Wilkinson,  Professor Emeritus of Social Epidemiology at the University of Nottingham
Zoe Williams, writer and journalist
Walter Wolfgang, peace activist

Liz Kendall
David Aaronovitch, journalist
Nick Cohen, journalist
Philip Collins, journalist 
Rod Liddle, journalist
John Mills, businessman and party donor
John Rentoul, journalist
Dave Rowntree, Blur drummer, solicitor, animator, and political activist

Constituency Labour Parties

Andy Burnham
Burnham received the nominations of 111 CLPs.
 
Aldershot CLP
Ayr CLP
Banff and Buchan CLP
Barnsley East CLP
Barrow and Furness CLP
Basildon and Billericay CLP
Beckenham CLP
Bexleyheath and Crayford CLP
Bishop Auckland CLP
Blackley and Broughton CLP
Blaydon CLP
Blyth Valley CLP
Bolton South East CLP
Bolton West CLP
Bootle CLP
Brentwood and Ongar CLP
Bristol East CLP
Bristol North West CLP
Burton and Uttoxeter CLP
Carmarthen West and South Pembrokeshire CLP
Carrick, Cumnock and Doon Valley CLP
Chatham and Aylesford CLP
Cheadle CLP
Clackmannanshire and Dunblane CLP
Congleton CLP
Copeland CLP
Cumbernauld and Kilsyth CLP
Dartford CLP
Derby South CLP
Don Valley CLP
Dudley North CLP
Dudley South CLP
Dunfermline CLP
Ealing Southall CLP
East Kilbride CLP
East Surrey CLP
Eastbourne CLP
Eastwood CLP
Epsom and Ewell CLP
Finchley and Golders Green CLP
Folkestone and Hythe CLP
Forest of Dean CLP
Glasgow Provan CLP
Glasgow Shettleston CLP
Glasgow Southside CLP
Gloucester CLP
Halesowen and Rowley Regis CLP
Halton CLP
Hamilton, Larkhall and Stonehouse CLP
Harlow CLP
Heywood and Middleton CLP
Hornchurch and Upminster CLP
Jarrow CLP
Kingston upon Hull East CLP
Kingswood CLP
Knowsley CLP
Lancaster and Fleetwood CLP
Leigh CLP
Liverpool Walton CLP
Liverpool West Derby CLP
Maidenhead CLP
Makerfield CLP
Manchester Central CLP
Mansfield CLP
Mid Sussex CLP
Mid Worcestershire CLP
Middlesbrough CLP
Midlothian South CLP
Morecambe and Lunesdale CLP
New Forest West CLP
Newcastle-under-Lyme CLP
North Swindon CLP
North Tyneside CLP
North West Leicestershire CLP
Northern Ireland CLP
Oldham East and Royton CLP
Paisley CLP
Pontypridd CLP
Poplar and Limehouse CLP
Pudsey CLP
Redditch CLP
Rochester and Strood CLP
Romford CLP
Ruislip, Northwood and Pinner CLP
Rutherglen CLP
Sefton Central CLP
Sheffield Brightside and Hillsborough CLP
Sheffield South East CLP
Slough CLP
South Leicestershire CLP
South Shields CLP
South West Devon CLP
Southport CLP
St Helen's North CLP
Stockton North CLP
Stoke South CLP
Strathkelvin and Bearsden CLP
Telford CLP
Torfaen CLP
Tunbridge Wells CLP
Uddingston and Bellshill CLP
Wansbeck CLP
Warrington North CLP
West Lancashire CLP
Wirral South CLP
Woking CLP
Wolverhampton North East CLP
Workington CLP
Worsley and Eccles South CLP
Wrexham CLP
Wyre Forest CLP

Yvette Cooper
Cooper received the nominations of 109 CLPs.

Aberavon CLP
Aberdeenshire West CLP
Altrincham and Sale West CLP
Angus South CLP
Argyll and Bute CLP
Basingstoke CLP
Bassetlaw CLP
Battersea CLP
Birmingham Hodge Hill CLP
Birmingham Perry Barr CLP
Bognor Regis CLP
Bolton North East CLP
Bracknell CLP
Brecon and Radnorshire CLP
Bridgend CLP
Bromsgrove CLP
Broxbourne CLP
Bury North CLP
Bury South CLP
Caerphilly CLP
Carshalton and Wallington CLP
Chelmsford CLP
Chelsea and Fulham CLP
Clydebank and Milngavie CLP
Chesham and Amersham CLP
Chippenham CLP
Chipping Barnet CLP
Christchurch CLP
Colchester CLP
Coventry South CLP
Crawley CLP
Cunninghame South CLP
Delyn CLP
Dumfries and Galloway CLP
Ealing Central and Acton CLP
Edinburgh East CLP
Erewash CLP
Exeter CLP
Garston and Halewood CLP
Glasgow Anniesland CLP
Glasgow Cathcart CLP
Glasgow Kelvin CLP
Gravesham CLP
Great Grimsby CLP
Greenwich and Woolwich CLP
Hackney South and Shoreditch CLP
Harrow West CLP
Harrogate and Knaresborough CLP
Hammersmith CLP
Hampstead and Kilburn CLP
Hendon CLP
Hertsmere CLP
Hexham CLP
Hitchin and Harpenden CLP
Inverness and Nairn CLP
Kenilworth and Southam CLP
Leicester East CLP
Loughborough CLP
Macclesfield CLP
Manchester Withington CLP
Morley and Outwood CLP
Ogmore CLP
Old Bexley and Sidcup CLP
Newcastle East CLP
Normanton, Pontefract and Castleford CLP
Northampton South CLP
Northampton North CLP
North East Fife CLP
Norwich South CLP
Pendle CLP
Plymouth Moor View CLP
Plymouth Sutton and Devonport CLP
Reigate CLP
Renfrewshire South CLP
Rochford and Southend East CLP
Romsey and Southampton North CLP
Runnymede and Weybridge CLP
Rutland and Melton CLP
Saffron Walden CLP
Selby and Ainsty CLP
Shipley CLP
Sittingbourne and Sheppey CLP
Sleaford and North Hykeham CLP
St Albans CLP
St Helens South and Whiston CLP
Stevenage CLP
Stoke Central CLP
South Dorset CLP
South West Norfolk CLP
South West Surrey CLP
Southend West CLP
Surrey Heath CLP
Taunton Deane CLP
Tewkesbury CLP
Thurrock CLP
Tiverton and Honiton CLP
Totnes CLP
Tooting CLP
Truro and Falmouth CLP
Twickenham CLP
Vale of Glamorgan CLP
Warley CLP
Warrington South CLP
Watford CLP
Westminster North CLP
Wimbledon CLP
Wirral West CLP
Witney CLP
Yeovil CLP

Jeremy Corbyn
Corbyn received the nominations of 152 CLPs.

Aberdeen Central CLP
Airdrie and Shotts CLP
Aldridge Brownhills CLP
Almond Valley CLP
Alyn and Deeside CLP
Amber Valley CLP
Ashfield CLP
Ashton-under-Lyne CLP
Aylesbury CLP
Bath CLP
Batley and Spen CLP
Bedford CLP
Berwick CLP
Bethnal Green and Bow CLP
Birmingham Yardley CLP
Blaenau Gwent CLP
Bournemouth West CLP
Brent Central CLP
Brent North CLP
Bridgwater and West Somerset CLP
Brigg and Goole CLP
Bromley and Chislehurst CLP
Broxtowe CLP
Bury St Edmunds CLP
Calder Valley CLP
Cannock Chase CLP
Castle Point CLP
Central Devon CLP
Chingford and Woodford Green CLP
Crewe and Nantwich CLP
Croydon Central CLP
Croydon North CLP
Dagenham and Rainham CLP
Derby North CLP
Derbyshire Dales CLP
Devizes CLP
Doncaster Central CLP
Dundee City East CLP
Dundee City West CLP
Easington CLP
East Devon CLP
Edinburgh Central CLP
Edinburgh North and Leith CLP
Edinburgh Pentlands CLP
Edinburgh West CLP
Edmonton CLP
Ellesmere Port CLP
Elmet and Rothwell CLP
Enfield North CLP
Enfield Southgate CLP
Erith and Thamesmead CLP
Gateshead CLP
Glasgow Maryhill and Springburn CLP
Glasgow Pollok CLP
Gower CLP
Grantham and Stamford CLP
Great Yarmouth CLP
Greenock and Inverclyde CLP
Hackney North and Stoke Newington CLP
Halifax CLP
Harborough CLP
Harrow East CLP
Hartlepool CLP
Havant CLP
Hayes and Harlington CLP
Hemel Hempstead CLP
Hemsworth CLP
Holborn and St Pancras CLP
Hornsey and Wood Green CLP
Horsham CLP
Ilford South CLP
Isle of Wight CLP
Islington North CLP
Islington South and Finsbury CLP
Kensington CLP
Kilmarnock and Irvine CLP
Kingston Upon Hull North CLP
Leeds East CLP
Leeds North East CLP
Leeds North West CLP
Leeds West CLP
Leicester South CLP
Lewisham Deptford CLP
Lewisham West CLP
Leyton and Wanstead CLP
Linlithgow CLP
Liverpool Riverside CLP
Luton North CLP
Luton South CLP
Manchester Gorton CLP
Merthyr Tydfil and Rhymney CLP
Mid Fife and Glenrothes CLP
Midlothian North and Musselburgh CLP
Motherwell and Wishaw CLP
Newcastle Central CLP
Newport East CLP
North Cornwall CLP
North Devon CLP
North Herefordshire CLP
North Norfolk CLP
North Shropshire CLP
North Somerset CLP
North West Hampshire CLP
Norwich North CLP
Nottingham East CLP
Nottingham South CLP
Oldham East and Saddleworth CLP
Perthshire North CLP
Perthshire South CLP
Peterborough CLP
Preseli Pembrokeshire CLP
Preston CLP
Richmond Park CLP
Rugby CLP
Salford and Eccles CLP
Scarborough and Whitby CLP
Scunthorpe CLP
Sherwood CLP
Shrewsbury and Atcham CLP
Skipton and Ripon CLP
Somerton and Frome CLP
South Basildon and East Thurrock CLP
South Derbyshire CLP
South East Cornwall CLP
South Northamptonshire CLP
South Ribble CLP
South Suffolk CLP
South West Wiltshire CLP
Southampton Itchen CLP
Southampton Test CLP
St Austell and Newquay CLP
St Ives CLP
Stalybridge and Hyde CLP
Stratford-on-Avon CLP
Sunderland Central CLP
Sutton and Cheam CLP
Swansea East CLP
Swansea West CLP
Thirsk and Malton CLP
Thornbury and Yate CLP
Tottenham CLP
Uxbridge and South Ruislip CLP
Wakefield CLP
Wallasey CLP
Walthamstow CLP
Warwick and Leamington CLP
Washington and Sunderland West CLP
Wealden CLP
West Ham CLP
West Suffolk CLP
Westmorland and Lonsdale CLP
Wolverhampton South West CLP
Wycombe CLP
Wythenshawe and Sale CLP
Ynys Mon CLP

Liz Kendall
Kendall received the nominations of 18 CLPs.
Barking CLP
Bermondsey and Old Southwark CLP
Camberwell and Peckham CLP
Carmarthen East and Dinefwr CLP
Cities of London and Westminster CLP
Croydon South CLP
Dulwich and West Norwood CLP
East Ham CLP
Ilford North CLP
Leicester West CLP
Lewisham East CLP
Mitcham and Morden CLP
Moray CLP
Newton Abbot CLP
Sedgefield CLP
Streatham CLP
Wolverhampton South East CLP
Vauxhall CLP

Undeclared
256 CLPs did not nominate a candidate for party leader.

Aberconwy CLP
Aberdeen Donside CLP
Aberdeen South and North Kincardine CLP
Aberdeenshire East CLP
Angus North and Mearns CLP
Arfon CLP
Arundel and South Downs CLP
Ashford CLP
Banbury CLP
Banffshire and Buchan Coast CLP
Barnsley Central CLP
Beaconsfield CLP
Beverley and Holderness CLP
Bexhill and Battle CLP
Birkenhead CLP
Birmingham Edgbaston CLP
Birmingham Erdington CLP
Birmingham Hall Green CLP
Birmingham Ladywood CLP
Birmingham Northfield CLP
Birmingham Selly Oak CLP
Blackburn CLP
Blackpool North and Cleveleys CLP
Blackpool South CLP
Bolsover CLP
Boston and Skegness CLP
Bosworth CLP
Bournemouth East CLP
Bradford East CLP
Bradford South CLP
Bradford West CLP
Braintree CLP
Brentford and Isleworth CLP
Bridgwater and West Somerset CLP
Brighton Kemptown CLP
Brighton Pavilion CLP
Bristol South CLP
Bristol West CLP
Broadland CLP
Buckingham CLP
Burnley CLP
Caithness, Sutherland and Ross CLP
Camborne and Redruth CLP
Cambridge CLP
Canterbury CLP
Cardiff Central CLP
Cardiff North CLP
Cardiff South and Penarth CLP
Cardiff West CLP
Carlisle CLP
Central Suffolk and Central Ipswich CLP
Ceredigion CLP
Charnwood CLP
Chesterfield CLP
Cheltenham CLP
Chichester CLP
Chorley CLP
City of Chester CLP
City of Durnham CLP
Clacton CLP
Cleethorpes CLP
Clwyd South CLP 
Clwyd West CLP
Clydesdales CLP
Coatbridge and Chryston CLP
Colne Valley CLP
Corby CLP
Coventry North East CLP
Coventry North West CLP
Cowdenbeath CLP
Cunninghame North CLP
Cynon Valley CLP
Darlington CLP
Daventry CLP
Denton and Reddish CLP
Dewsbury CLP
Doncaster North CLP
Dover CLP
Dumbarton CLP
Dunfermline CLP
Ealing North CLP
East Hampshire CLP
East Lothian CLP
East Worthing and Shoreham CLP
East Yorkshire CLP
Eastleigh CLP
Eddisbury CLP
Edinburgh South CLP
Eltham CLP
Epping Forest CLP
Esher and Walton CLP
Ettrick, Roxburgh and Berwickshire CLP
Falkirk East CLP
Falkirk West CLP
Fareham CLP
Faversham and Mid Kent CLP
Feltham and Heston CLP
Filton and Bradley Stoke CLP
Fylde CLP
Gainsborough CLP
Gedling CLP
Gillingham and Rainham CLP
Gosport CLP
Guildford CLP
Haltemprice and Howden CLP
Harwich and North Essex CLP
Hastings and Rye CLP
Hazel Grove CLP
Henley CLP
Hereford and South Herefordshire CLP
Hertford and Stortford CLP
High Peak CLP
Houghton and Sunderland South CLP
Hove CLP
Huddersfield CLP
Huntingdon CLP
Hyndburn CLP
Inverness and Nairn CLP
Ipswich CLP
Islwyn CLP
Keighley CLP
Kettering CLP
Kingston upon Hull West and Hessle CLP
Kirkcaldy CLP
Leeds Central CLP
Lewes CLP
Lichfield CLP
Lincoln CLP
Liverpool Riverside CLP
Liverpool Wavertree CLP
Llanelli CLP
Louth and Horncastle CLP
Ludlow CLP
Maidstone and The Weald CLP
Maldon CLP
Meon Valley CLP
Meriden CLP
Mid Bedfordshire CLP
Mid Derbyshire CLP
Mid Dorset and North Poole CLP
Mid Norfolk CLP
Middlesbrough South and East Cleveland CLP
Milton Keynes North CLP
Milton Keynes South CLP
Mole Valley CLP
Monmouth CLP
Montgomeryshire CLP
Na h-Eileanan an Iar CLP
Neath CLP
New Forest East CLP
Newark CLP
Newbury CLP
Newcastle North CLP
Newport West CLP
North Dorset CLP
North Durham CLP
North East Bedfordshire CLP
North East Cambridgeshire CLP
North East Derbyshire CLP
North East Hampshire CLP
North East Hertfordshire CLP
North East Somerset CLP
North Thanet CLP
North Warwickshire CLP
North West Cambridgeshire CLP
North West Durham CLP
North West Norfolk CLP
North Wiltshire CLP
Nottingham North CLP
Nuneaton CLP
Orkney CLP
Orpington CLP
Oxford East CLP
Oxford West and Abingdon CLP
Penistone and Stocksbridge CLP
Penrith and The Broder CLP
Poole CLP
Portsmouth North CLP
Portsmouth South CLP
Putney CLP
Rayleigh and Wickford CLP
Reading East CLP
Reading West CLP
Redcar CLP
Renfrewshire North and West CLP
Rhondda CLP
Ribble Valley CLP
Richmond (Yorks) CLP
Rochdale CLP
Rossendale and Darwen CLP
Rother Valley CLP
Rotherham CLP
Rushcliffe CLP
Salisbury CLP
Sevenoaks CLP 
Sheffield Central CLP
Sheffield Hallam CLP 
Sheffield Heeley CLP
Shetland CLP
Skye, Lochaber and Badenoch CLP
Solihull CLP
South Cambridgeshire CLP
South East Cambridgeshire CLP
South Holland and The Deepings
South Norfolk CLP
South Staffordshire CLP
South Swindon CLP
South Thanet CLP
South West Bedfordshire CLP
South West Hertfordshire CLP
Spelthorne CLP
Stafford CLP
Staffordshire Moorlands CLP
Stirling CLP
Stockport CLP
Stockton South CLP
Stoke-on-Trent CLP
Stone CLP
Stourbridge CLP
Stretford and Urmston CLP
Stroud CLP
Suffolk Coastal CLP
Sutton Coldfield CLP
Tamworth CLP
Tatton CLP
The Cotswolds CLP
The Wrekin CLP
Tonbridge and Malling CLP
Torbay CLP
Torridge and West Devon CLP
Tynemouth CLP
Vale of Clwyd CLP
Walsall North CLP
Walsall South CLP
Wantage CLP
Waveney CLP
Weaver Vale CLP
Wellingborough CLP
Wells CLP
Welwyn Hatfield CLP
Wentworth and Dearne CLP
West Bromwich East CLP
West Bromwich West CLP
West Dorset CLP
West Worcestershire CLP
Weston-Super-Mare CLP
Wigan CLP
Winchester CLP
Windsor CLP
Witham CLP
Wokingham CLP
Worcester CLP
Worthing West CLP
Wyre and Preston North CLP
York Central CLP
York Outer CLP

Affiliated trade unions

Andy Burnham
Union of Construction, Allied Trades and Technicians (UCATT)
Union of Shop, Distributive and Allied Workers (USDAW)
Musicians' Union (MU)

Yvette Cooper
Community
National Union of Mineworkers (NUM)

Jeremy Corbyn
Associated Society of Locomotive Engineers and Firemen (ASLEF)
Bakers, Food and Allied Workers' Union (BFAWU)
Communication Workers Union (CWU)
Transport Salaried Staffs' Association (TSSA)
UNISON
Unite the Union (Unite)

Undeclared
Broadcasting, Entertainment, Communications and Theatre Union (BECTU)
General, Municipal, Boilermakers and Allied Trade Union (GMB)
Unity

Non-affiliated trade unions

Jeremy Corbyn
Fire Brigades Union (FBU)
National Union of Rail, Maritime and Transport Workers (RMT)
Prison Officers Association (POA)

Socialist societies

Yvette Cooper
Jewish Labour Movement

Jeremy Corbyn
Socialist Educational Association
Socialist Health Association

Liz Kendall
Labour Party Irish Society

Undeclared

BAME Labour
Chinese for Labour
Christians on the Left
Disability Labour
Fabian Society
Labour Animal Welfare Society
Labour Campaign for International Development 
LGBT Labour
Labour Finance and Industry Group
Labour Housing Group
Labour Movement for Europe
Labour Students 
Labour Women's Network
National Union of Labour and Socialist Clubs
Scientists for Labour
Socialist Environment and Resources Association
Society of Labour Lawyers
Tamils for Labour

Political parties

Jeremy Corbyn
Podemos, left-wing political party in Spain
Socialist Party, Trotskyist political party in England and Wales

Organisations

Jeremy Corbyn

Alliance for Workers' Liberty (AWL)
Beard Liberation Front
Campaign for Labour Party Democracy (CLPD)
Communist Party of Great Britain (Provisional Central Committee)
Disabled People Against Cuts (DPAC)
Global Women's Strike
Hands off Venezuela
Labour Campaign for Free Education
Labour CND
Labour Party Marxists
Labour Representation Committee (LRC)
National Campaign Against Fees and Cuts (NCAFC)
Oxford University Labour Club (OULC) 
Surrey Labour Students
People's Assembly Against Austerity
Red Labour
Southall Black Sisters
Stop the War Coalition (StWC)
UK Uncut
Workers' Power

Liz Kendall
Progress

Publications

References

2015 in the United Kingdom
2015 Labour Party (UK) leadership election
Labour Party leadership electiom, 2015
Labour Party leadership election (UK)